Sisyrinchium idahoense, the Idaho blue-eyed grass, is a perennial that is native to western North America. It is not a true grass, but is instead in the family Iridaceae.

Characteristics
Sisyrinchium idahoense is found in generally moist grassy areas and open woodlands, and by stream banks, below . It grows 6–18 in tall with narrow grass-like leaves. The flower is usually a deep bluish purple to blue-violet, or pale blue, rarely white, and yellow-throated.

References

External links

Jepson manual - Sisyrinchium idahoense
Sisyrinchium idahoense - Photo gallery

idahoense
Flora of the Western United States
Flora of British Columbia
Flora of the Sierra Nevada (United States)
Flora of California
Flora of the West Coast of the United States
Flora of North America
Plants described in 1899
Flora without expected TNC conservation status